Brondi is a telecommunications company established in Italy by Lorenzo Brondi in 1935 to produce telephones in the postwar years. It became one of the main suppliers of the state Italian telephonic company, SIP, producing a famous Italian landline phone, Sirio.

In the beginning Brondi was specialized in landline telephones, it produced the first certified cordless telephone for the Italian market (in 1987 with Bronditel) and was the first company to invest in mobile phones in Italy in the 1990s.

Now the company is specialized in Dual Sim mobile phones, Android mobile phones, landline phones and transceivers.

Awards
The Enorme Telephone, designed by Ettore Sottsass for Brondi (1986) is part of the MOMA Museum of Modern Art's collection in New York and the designer 'choice USA. It was Manufactured by Brondi between 1986 and 1994.

See also

List of Italian Companies

External links
 Brondi Website www.brondi.it

Telecommunications companies of Italy
Mobile phone manufacturers
Electronics companies of Italy
Telecommunications companies established in 1935
Italian companies established in 1935
Italian brands
Electronics companies established in 1935